Katrina Frye Shealy (born December 25, 1954, in Columbia, South Carolina) is an American politician, and a member of the South Carolina State Senate. She is a Republican but was elected as a petition candidate from District 23 in Lexington County. At the time of her election she was the only woman in the South Carolina Senate but is now one of five women currently serving in the South Carolina State Senate.

She is an insurance executive and the former chairwoman of the Lexington County Republican Party.

Electoral history
In 2008, Shealy ran for the Republican Party's State Senate District 23 nomination against long-time incumbent state senator Jake Knotts. Despite support from prominent Republicans including United States Senator Jim DeMint, Shealy was defeated. Shealy filed again as a candidate in the 2012 Republican primary. Her name was removed from the ballot after it was determined that she incorrectly filed her candidate paperwork. This case went to the SC Supreme Court and resulted in the removal of over 200 candidates from the ballot that year who had also incorrectly filed their paperwork. It was known as the Great Ballot Debacle of 2012. Shealy fought to have her name added to the general election ballot as a petition candidate and won the November 7, 2012 general election with 51% of the vote.

South Carolina State Senate
In her first term Shealy served on the Agricultural and Natural Resources committee, Corrections and Penology committee, Fish, Game and Forestry committee, General committee and the Judiciary committee.

In 2015, Shealy was elected First Vice Chairman of the South Carolina Republican Party.

Shealy was reelected to serve a third term on November 3, 2020. She now serves on the Finance Committee, Labor, Commerce and Industry, Rules, Family and Veteran Services, which she chairs, and Corrections and Penology. Shealy was appointed to serve on the SC Joint Citizens and Legislative Committee On Children and also serves as chair of the Southeastern Legislative Committee Human Services and Public Safety Committee. Shealy serves as Chair of the Family and Veterans Services Committee and is the first Republican woman to serve as chair of a Standing Committee in the South Carolina Senate. Shealy is also co-chair of the SC Suicide Prevention Coalition and a member of the Governor's Committee on Domestic Violence. She also serves on the Senate Operations and Management Committee.  Senator Shealy is the chair-elect for the National Foundation of Women Legislators.

In 2015 Shealy created a 501(c)3, Katrina’s Kids, to serve children in Foster Care and Group Homes across all 46 counties in South Carolina. The foundation raises funds to send children to summer camp, participate in sporting opportunities, or any approved extra curricular activity not supported by State Funding. The foundation has also helped with medical or dental funding for children. Katrina’s Kids holds an Annual Music Benefit and a Race for the Case 5K event that helps supply suitcases and backpacks for children entering foster care.

In 2018 Shealy was the sponsor of Legislation in SC that was signed into law by the Governor creating the Office of the Child Advocate (S805). This Agency has oversight over the nine state agencies that handle children issues and goes into effect 7/1/2019.

In 2022 Shealy received national attention for a speech criticizing her colleagues' approach to abortion legislation.

Awards
Shealy has received the following awards:
 2013 Outstanding Female Statesman Award for Lexington County Republican Party
 South Carolina Republican Party 2013 Terry Haskins Award
 South Carolina Federation of Republican Women's 2013 Woman of the Year
 Strom Thurmond Award for Excellence in Government in Public Service, 2013
 Saluda River Chapter of Trout Unlimited Conservationist of the Year, 2013
 2014 South Carolina Wildlife Federation Conservationist of the Year
 2014 South Carolina Taxpayers Association "Friend of the Taxpayer" Award
 2014 Woodman of the World "Community Leadership"
 2015 National Association of Social Workers (NASW) Legislator of the Year
 2015 Palmetto Trout Award
 2015 Palmetto Center for Women Twin Award
 2015 SCCADVASA Legislator of the Year
 2016 Children's Advocacy Champion for Children
 2016 United Way Common Good Award for Volunteerism
 2016 Trailblazer Award for Leadership on Domestic Violence Issues
 2016 SCSHA Legislator of the Year Award
 2016 FGA Champion for Children
 2017 S.C. Beer Wholesalers Legislator of the Year
 2017 American Legion Special Legislative Award
 2017 Respectable Award, Able SC
 2017 Legislative Award, S.C. Department of Probation, Pardon, and Parole Services
 2019 Chair Elect National Foundation of Women Legislators
 2018-2020 Chair Southeastern Legislative Conference Human Service and Public Safety Committee 
 2019 Board National Conference of State Legislature Women's Network

References

External links 

Official page at the South Carolina General Assembly
Campaign site
 

1954 births
Living people
Politicians from Columbia, South Carolina
Republican Party South Carolina state senators
Women state legislators in South Carolina
21st-century American politicians
21st-century American women politicians
Women in the South Carolina State Senate